The Maokong Gondola is a gondola lift transportation system in Taipei, Taiwan. Opened on 4 July 2007, the Maokong Gondola operates between Taipei Zoo and Maokong. The  line has four passenger stations. The facilities of the gondola were contracted to the French company Poma.

Stations

The line has four stations:

On leaving Zhinan Temple or Maokong Stations, regular and frequent minibus services can ferry visitors to destinations around the Maokong area. Minibus services can also deliver passengers directly back to the Taipei Zoo MRT station.

Fares
When operating, the fares are based on the number of stations traveled:
1 Station: NT$70
2 Stations: NT$100
3 Stations: NT$120

Concessional fares are available to disability and seniors aged over 65.
1 Station  NT$15
2 Stations NT$20
3 Stations NT$25

Fares can be paid by either purchasing the tickets at the stations or using EasyCard or stored-value card. Each adult ticket can bring 2 children for free. Discounts are available for group travelling. Groups of 10 or above will receive 20% off their ticket price while groups of 40 or above will receive 30% off.

Tourists can also purchase the Maokong Gondola version of the one-day Taipei Pass for unlimited rides on Taipei buses and MRTs, and up to 3 gondola rides in one day.  This special one-day Taipei Pass costs NT$350.

Reported issues

Safety concerns and repairs
The system was closed for 16 months due to safety concerns and repair efforts. It was reopened in April 2010.

Ventilation problems
Ventilation in each passenger cabin has been criticized as being inadequate so that passengers should be forewarned that the cabin may become extremely hot and humid, especially in the midday sun. This has been largely mentioned when the Maokong Gondola began operating with several "halts" during service hours, trapping the mid-day heat within the cabins.

Recommendations have been made to equip cable cars with solar panels to generate power for ventilation or fans.

Service interruptions and technical problems
On the first day of operation, a faulty door lock left Mayor Hau Lung-pin and former Mayor Ma Ying-jeou suspended for 10 minutes in mid-air. Later, bad weather also caused operations to shut down a few times. Violent thunderstorms returned the next day and operation was suspended for a few hours.

At 4:50 p.m. on 21 July 2007, the service on the gondola system was suspended for approximately 2 hours due to a mechanical glitch, trapping 323 people on the cable cars. The evacuation took place from 5:50 p.m. through 6:55 p.m. TRTS personnel reimbursed passengers by giving them NT$1,058 and free tickets worth NT$100 each. The system resumed normal operations at noon the following day.

On 24 July 2007, the service on the gondola system was suspended twice. Service was suspended at noon for around two hours due to a thunderstorm, and again at 3:10 p.m. due to mechanical problems. No passengers were trapped on the gondola cars. Consumers' Foundation, Taiwan recommended that the Maokong Gondola should shut down completely, and only re-open after evaluating and repairing all systems.

Originally the Maokong Gondola was closed to public every Monday for maintenance servicing, in accordance to an agreement with Taipei City Hall. In July 2008, a full week of maintenance was also done.

On 2 October 2008 the Maokong Gondola was closed pending structural repair after mudslides left a 2.5 meter gap beneath a support pillar.

Environmental concerns
Local environmental protection groups such as Green Party Taiwan and Homemaker's Union have discouraged people from using the gondola lift. Local residents have complained about excessive noise during operation, increased garbage and the danger of mudslides.

Tests conducted by the Environmental Protection Administration under the Executive Yuan and the TCG Department of Environmental Protection have shown that noise levels are within regulations. To mitigate environmental damage, construction pillars and excavation were minimized.

On 2 November 2008, concerns were legitimized when a mudslide and earthquake eroded pillar T16, which now hung 2.5 meters above ground. The System was then closed for repairs and was reopened before April 2010 after inspectors found that the design, construction method, and engineering quality all met with requirements.

Typhoon Jangmi and erosion of pillar foundation
Rains associated with Typhoon Jangmi caused erosion around a pillar on the Corner 2 Station. As a result, on 1 October 2008 operations of the Gondola were suspended for one month to allow a full safety inspection to be carried out.

On December 1, investigators recommended the relocation of pillar T16, the foundation of which had been eroded by the rainfall of four typhoons and was very unlikely to withstand future earthquakes. Relocating T16 and neighboring pillars took two years. The gondola officially resumed service as of 31 March 2010, after relocation of the pillar and passing safety inspections.

These and other problems have contributed to the system's consistent financial losses.

Crystal cabins
Since 30 March 2010, thirty cabins have been retrofitted with 48mm thick glass bottoms, each weighing 213 kg. They operate with a service interval of three minutes. The capacity is limited to five persons per cabin. Crystal cabins, also called “Eyes of Maokong Gondola”, have their own waiting queue and a computer managed ticketing system, instructing passengers to enter the queue at a specified time. Currently, the price for taking a crystal cabin is the same as that of regular cabins. The cost of each cabin modification was NT$200,000.

See also
 Transportation in Taiwan

References and notes

External links
Maokong official tourism website 
Maokong Gondola 
Maokong Gondola, Mayor Ma's Proudest City Project, Suffers 55 Glitches in 11 Days